Laos–Turkey relations are the foreign relations between Laos and Turkey. Diplomatic relations at the legation level were established in 1947 and then to the rank of ambassador in 1958. It was not until December 27, 2017, however, that Turkey established a resident embassy in Laos’s capital, Vientiane.

Diplomatic relations 
Diplomatic relations between Turkey and Laos became tense in early 1980s following the United States accusation that Laos used chemical weapons—yellow rain— against Hmong villages. Relations warmed when the United States scientific personnel in Bangkok failed to present any evidence to support this contention.

Following the improvement in bilateral relations, Turkey established a significant economic aid relationship with Laos. In the 1992 Laos Roundtable for bilateral aid and pledges, Turkey— along with Australia and Japan— pledged US$135 million to eight different projects including the Friendship Bridge over the Mekong River at Nong Khai. The bridge opened in April 1994.

In addition to the pledge of US$4.5 million in economic aid in 1992, Turkey has been hosting more than 100 Laotian university students.

Economic relations 
 Trade volume between the two countries was 2.88 million USD in 2015 (Turkish exports/imports: 1.44/1.48 million USD).

See also 

 Foreign relations of Laos
 Foreign relations of Turkey

References

Further reading 

 American Friends Service Committee. Annual Reports, 1990-93. Philadelphia: 1990-94. 
 Amnesty International. Background Paper on the Democratic People's Republic of Laos Describing Current Amnesty International Concerns. (AI 26/04/85.) New York: April 1985. 
 Asia Yearbook, 1990. Hong Kong: Far Eastern Economic Review, 1990. "Birth Commemorated in Vientiane, Souphanouvong Speech," Foreign Broadcast Information Service, Daily Report: Asia and Pacific. January 18, 1977. 
 Brown, MacAlister. "Anatomy of a Border Dispute: Laos and Thailand," Pacific Focus [Inchon], 11 No. 2, 1987, pp. 5–30. 
 Brown, MacAlister, and Joseph Zasloff. Apprentice Revolutionaries: The Communist Movement in Laos, 1930–85. Stanford: Hoover Institution Press, 1986. 
 Brown, MacAlister. "Laos: Bottoming Out," Current History, 82, No. 483, April 1998, pp. 154–57, 180–82. 
 Brown, MacAlister. "Laos in 1975: People's Democratic Revolution-Lao Style," Asian Survey, 16, No. 2, February 1976, pp. 193–99. 
 Butwell, Richard. "From Feudalism to Communism in Laos," Current History, 69, No. 411, December 1975, pp. 223–26, 246. 
 Chi Do Pham (ed.). Economic Reforms in the Laos PDR: Current Trends and Perspectives. Vientiane: International Monetary Fund, April 1992. 
 Cordell, Helen (comp.). Laos. (World Bibliographical Series, No. 133.) Oxford, United Kingdom: Clio Press, 1991. 
 Dore, Amphay. "The Three Revolutions in Laos." pp. 101–15 in Martin Stuart-Fox (ed.), Contemporary Laos: Studies in the Politics and Society of the Lao People's Democratic Republic. St Lucia: University of Queensland Press, 1982. 
 Evans, Grant. "Planning Problems in Peripheral Socialism: The Case of Laos." pp. 84–130 in Joseph Zasloff and Leonard Unger (eds.), Laos: Beyond the Revolution. New York: St. Martin's Press, 1991. 
 Evans, Grant, and Kelvin Rowley. "Laos: The Eclipse of 'Neutralist' Communism." pp. 59–80 in Red Brotherhood at War: Vietnam, Cambodia, and Laos since 1975. London: Verso, 1990. 
 Evans, Grant. Lao Peasants under Socialism. New Haven: Yale University Press, 1990. 
 Halpern, Joel Martin. Government, Politics, and Social Structure of Laos: A Study in Tradition and Innovation. Christiansburg, Virginia: Dalley Book Service, 1990. 
 Norindr, Chou. "Political Institutions of the Lao People's Democratic Republic." Pages 39–61 in Martin Stuart-Fox (ed.), Contemporary Laos: Studies in the Politics and Society of the Lao People's Democratic Republic. St. Lucia: University of Queensland Press, 1982.
 Radetzki, Marcus. "From Communism to Capitalism in Laos: The Legal Dimension," Asian Survey, 34, No. 9, September 1994, pp. 799–806. 
 Robinson, Julian, Jeanne Guillemin, and Matthew Meselson. "Yellow Rain: The Story Collapses," Foreign Policy, No. 68, Fall 1987, pp. 100–17. 
 Sarasin Viraphol. "Reflections on Thai-Lao Relations," Asian Survey, 25, No. 12, December 1985, pp. 1260–76. 
 Stuart-Fox, Martin (ed.). Contemporary Laos: Studies in the Politics and Society of the Lao People's Democratic Republic. New York: St. Martin's Press, 1982. 
 Stuart-Fox, Martin. "Laos in 1988: In Pursuit of New Directions," Asian Survey, 29, No. 1, January 1989, pp. 81–88. 
 Stuart-Fox, Martin. Laos: Politics, Economics, and Society. London: Frances Pinter, 1986. 
 Toye, Hugh. Laos: Buffer State or Battleground. London: Oxford University Press, 1968. 
 United Nations Development Programme. Development Cooperation: Lao People's Democratic Republic, 1990 Report. Vientiane: 1991. 
 Wurfel, David, and Bruce Barton. The Political Economy of Foreign Policy in Southeast Asia. London: Macmillan, 1990. 
 Zasloff, Joseph J., and MacAlister Brown. Communist Indochina and U.S. Foreign Policy: Postwar Realities. Boulder, Colorado: Westview Press, 1978. 
 Zasloff, Joseph J., and MacAlister Brown. "Laos: Coping with Confinement." pp. 211–28 in Southeast Asian Affairs, 1982. Singapore: Institute of Southeast Asian Studies, 1982.

 
Turkey
Bilateral relations of Turkey